The black swallower, Chiasmodon niger, is a species of deep sea fish in the family Chiasmodontidae. It is known for its ability to swallow fish larger than itself.

It is a very common and widespread ocean fish; of its genus, it is the most common species in the North Atlantic.

Description 
The body is elongated and compressed, without scales, and is a uniform brownish-black in color. Its head is long, with a blunt snout, moderately sized eyes, and a large mouth. The lower jaw protrudes past the upper; both jaws are lined with a single row of sharp, depressible teeth, which interlock when the mouth is closed. The first three teeth in each jaw are enlarged into canines.

A small lower spine occurs on the preoperculum. The pectoral fins are long, with 12–15 (usually 13) rays; the pelvic fins are small and contain five rays. Of the two dorsal fins, the first is spiny with 10–12 spines, and the second is longer with one spine and 26–29 soft rays. The anal fin contains one spine and 26–29 soft rays. The caudal fin is forked with 9 rays. The lateral line is continuous with two pores per body segment.

Feeding 

The black swallower feeds on bony fish,  which are swallowed whole. With its greatly distensible stomach, it is capable of swallowing prey over twice its length and 10 times its mass. Its upper jaws are articulated with the skull at the front via the suspensorium, which allows the jaws to swing down and encompass objects larger than the swallower's head. Theodore Gill speculated that the swallower seizes prey fish by the tail, and then "walks" its jaws over the prey until it is fully coiled inside the stomach.

Black swallowers have been found to have swallowed fish so large that they could not be digested before decomposition set in, and the resulting release of gases forced the swallower to the ocean surface. This is, in fact, how most known specimens came to be collected.

Reproduction 
Reproduction is oviparous; the eggs are pelagic and measure  in diameter and contain a clear oil globule and six dark pigment patches, which become distributed along the newly hatched larva from in front of the eyes to the tip of the notochord. These patches eventually disappear and the body darkens overall to black. The eggs are mostly found in winter off South Africa; juveniles have been found from April to August off Bermuda.

The larvae and juveniles are covered in small, projecting spinules.

References

Chiasmodontidae
Fish described in 1864
Taxa named by James Yate Johnson